Anathallis fastigiata is a species of orchid plant native to Costa Rica.

References 

fastigiata
Flora of Costa Rica